Maurice Charles Langdon (12 October 1934 – 27 March 2022) was a New Zealand cricketer who played 25 first-class matches for Northern Districts from 1957 to 1965.

Langdon was a middle-order batsman and medium-pace bowler. He held the record for 33 years for best bowling in an innings by a Northern Districts player in first-class cricket. In January 1964 he claimed 8/21 against Auckland. This surpassed Gren Alabaster's mark of 8/30 of less than a year before, and stood until Alex Tait took 9/48 — also against Auckland — in February 1997.

Langdon died in Tauranga on 27 March 2022, aged 87.

References

External links
 
 

1934 births
2022 deaths
New Zealand cricketers
Cricketers from Whanganui
Northern Districts cricketers